71st Tactical Fighter Squadron may refer to:

 71st Fighter Training Squadron, USAF
 71st Tactical Fighter Squadron (Richthofen) of the German Luftwaffe